Lost Creek State Park may refer to:

 Lost Creek State Park (Montana), a park in Deer Lodge County, Montana, United States
 Lost Creek State Park (Utah), a park in Morgan County, Utah, United States